Jacinta Marie Allan (born 19 September 1973) is an Australian politician serving as the 29th and current deputy premier of Victoria since June 2022. She is a member of the Victorian Branch of the Australian Labor Party and has been a member of the Victorian Legislative Assembly (MLA) since 1999 for the division of Bendigo East. Allan is the longest serving Victorian female minister in the state's history, and currently the most senior sitting member of the Assembly.

A member of a prominent Bendigo political family, she is the granddaughter of the late Bendigo Trades Hall Council President William Allan.

Education 
Allan went to school at St Joseph’s Primary School in Quarry Hill, then Catholic College Bendigo. She completed her studies in a Bachelor of Arts (Hons) at La Trobe University in Bendigo.

Political career

Early career 
Allan served in the political offices of Steve Gibbons and Neil O'Keefe, before her election to parliament.

She was first elected at the 1999 state election at the age of 25, making her the youngest ever elected female parliamentarian in Victoria.

Bracks/Brumby governments (2002–2010) 
She entered the ministry after the 2002 election, serving as Minister for Education Services and Minister for Employment and Youth Affairs. After a cabinet reshuffle in 2006, Allan's responsibilities were altered slightly, losing Youth Affairs in exchange for Women's Affairs.

She was promoted in August 2007, in a reshuffle sparked by the accession of John Brumby to the premiership. In 2010, she became Minister for Industry and Trade. Allan was targeted by Right to Life organisations during her election campaign in 2010, having voted for abortion reform in parliament during 2008.

Opposition (2010–2014) 
After the defeat of the Brumby government in November 2010, Allan became manager of opposition business in the Legislative Assembly, as well as opposition spokeswoman for Roads, Regional and Rural Development and Bushfire Response. Since this time, Allan has also served as police and emergency services spokesperson.

In a reshuffle announced in December 2013, Allan became Shadow Minister for Agriculture, Regional Cities and Regional & Rural Development, in addition to her responsibilities as Manager of Opposition Business.

Andrews government (2014–present) 
After the 2014 Victorian state election, Allan was appointed as Minister for Public Transport and Minister for Employment in the First Andrews Ministry.

Following Labor’s victory, Allan was appointed Minister for Transport and Infrastructure in Second Andrews Ministry. The portfolio leads a large package of projects such as the Suburban Rail Loop and Metro Tunnel.

During the Victorian Government’s response to the COVID-19 health emergency, Allan became a member of the Crisis Council of Cabinet, serving as the Minister for the Coordination of Transport – COVID-19. In this role, she became responsible for leading all COVID-19 response activities across the transport portfolio.

Personal life
Allan was born and grew up in Bendigo. Her cousin Keith William Allan was murdered in 2000.

She is married and has two young children who attend the local primary school.

References

External links
 Parliamentary voting record of Jacinta Allan at Victorian Parliament Tracker

1973 births
Living people
Australian Labor Party members of the Parliament of Victoria
Members of the Victorian Legislative Assembly
Victorian Ministers for Women
People from Bendigo
21st-century Australian politicians
21st-century Australian women politicians
Women members of the Victorian Legislative Assembly